Mnatsakanyan or Mnatsakanian or Mnatsaganian is an Armenian surname. Notable people with the surname include:

Karen Mnatsakanyan (born 1977), Armenian sport wrestler
Lala Mnatsakanyan (born 1957), Armenian actress
Levon Mnatsakanyan (born 1965), Minister of Defence of Artsakh
Mamikon Mnatsakanian, Armenian mathematician
Norayr Mnatsakanyan (1923–1986), Armenian singer
Zohrab Mnatsakanian (born 1966), Armenian diplomat

Armenian-language surnames